The 21st Moscow International Film Festival was held from 19 to 29 July 1999. The Golden St. George was awarded to the Japanese film Will to Live directed by Kaneto Shindo.

Jury
 Fernando Solanas (Argentina – President of the Jury)
 Florestano Vancini (Italy)
 Adam Greenberg (United States)
 Shahla Nahid (France)
 Tolomush Okeyev (Kyrgyzstan)
 Valery Todorovsky (Russia)
 Antonio Giménez-Rico (Spain)
 Katia Tchenko (France)

Films in competition
The following films were selected for the main competition:

Awards
 Golden St. George: Will to Live by Kaneto Shindo
 Special Silver St. George: A Time for Defiance by Antonio Mercero
 Silver St. George:
 Best Director: Ágúst Guðmundsson for The Dance
 Best Actor: Farkhad Abdraimov for Fara
 Best Actor: Catherine Frot for The Dilettante
 Prix FIPRESCI: Will to Live by Kaneto Shindo
 Special Mention:
 Traveller by Paulo César Saraceni
 Strastnoy Boulevard by Vladimir Khotinenko
 Honorable Prize: For the contribution to cinema: Marco Bellocchio (director)

References

External links
Moscow International Film Festival: 1999 at Internet Movie Database

1999
1999 film festivals
Moscow
1999 in Moscow
Moscow
June 1999 events in Russia